Anomiopus birai is a species of true dung beetle that is known from Caaguazú and Concepción departments of Paraguay, and Mato Grosso do Sul and Mato Grosso states of Brazil. It is found in cerrado savanna at low altitudes, and is a myrmecophile (cohabits with ant colonies).

References

birai
Beetles described in 2006